The Santorini  was a fishing boat used for weapons-smuggling, which was captured in May 2001 by the Israeli Shayetet 13 Naval Commando Unit. This was the first ship caught in an attempt to smuggle weapons to Palestinian-controlled territories. In May 2002, three of the Santorini'''s crew members were convicted of attempting to smuggle weapons into the Gaza Strip.

Operation
The ship's crew was led by Captain Div Va'iza, a Lebanese citizen, and included two of his relatives, Hussein Va'iza and Fahdi Awadwas.  The three were  professional smugglers; a fourth crewmember was Va’iza's son.  The crew had been hired by Ahmed Jibril's Popular Front for the Liberation of Palestine – General Command and were asked to smuggle arms into Gaza. The crew refused the operation as too risky, but agreed instead to smuggle the arms to a location near the Egyptian Sinai coast, where they would be met by agents of the PFLP-GC. The crew made three failed attempts to rendezvous with the agents in Sinai and were captured on their fourth.

The Santorini had left northern Beirut On May 6, 2001, carrying weapons packed in barrels. Their plan was to drop the barrels off-shore, anchored at a pre-determined spot for later collection by Sinai-based agents.
A surveillance plane spotted the suspicious ship, and a Shayetet 13 commando team boarded the 40-ton ship near Rosh Hanikra, just off the coast of northern Israel's border with Lebanon.

Shipment
According to the IDF, the shipment contained the following weapons:
50 Katyusha rocket launchers
 Four Strela 2 (SA-7) antiaircraft missiles 
120 RKG anti-tank grenades 
20 rocket-propelled grenade launchers 
Two 60-mm mortars
98 60-mm mortar rounds
62 TMA-5 land mines
Eight TMA-3 anti-tank land mines
24 hand grenades 
30 Kalashnikov rifles 
116 gun cartridges for the rifles 
13,000 7.62-mm Kalashnikov bullets

Reactions
Popular Front for the Liberation of Palestine – General Command: the PFLP-GC confirmed the shipment was theirs, with Jibril quoted on Israel's Army radio as saying "This was not the first shipment, nor will it be the last."
Israel: Prime Minister Sharon said the event was "a very dangerous development" which "emphasises the intentions of the [Palestinian] authority." He described it as an extremely grave violation of all the agreements that Arafat signed with Israel.
Palestinian Authority – Palestinian Information Minister Yasser Abed Rabbo denied any connection to the smuggling attempt, and the PA's spokesman, Nabil Abu Rudaineh was quoted saying "For sure we have nothing to do with the shipment."

Aftermath
In May 2002, three of the Santorini'''s crewmembers were convicted, by a military tribunal, of attempting to smuggle weapons into Gaza. The key legal issues were whether the weapons were destined for Gaza (over which the court had jurisdiction, as it was then occupied by Israel), and whether the crew knew that Gaza was to be the final destination of the shipment. The fourth crewmember, Va’iza's son, was acquitted when the court determined he had not participated in the previous three attempts and that it was not proven that he knew the ship's destination.

Notes

Photos
 The Weaponry Ship - "Santorini"

Second Intifada
2001 in Israel
May 2001 events in Asia
Arms trafficking
Battles and conflicts without fatalities
Cross-border operations
Counterterrorism in Israel
Maritime incidents in Israel
Military operations of the Israeli–Palestinian conflict
Operations involving Israeli special forces
Israeli Navy